General Vishwa Nath Sharma, PVSM, AVSM, ADC (born 4 June 1930) was the 14th Chief of the Army Staff  of the Indian Army, serving between 1988–1990. He was the first Indian COAS to have begun his career in the post-Independence Indian Army.

Early life
His father, Major General Amar Nath Sharma, was also a military officer. He is the younger brother of the late Major Som Nath Sharma, recipient of Independent India's first posthumous Param Vir Chakra, and also Lieutenant General Surendra Nath Sharma, formerly Engineer in Chief of the Indian Army. Both brothers were educated at the Prince of Wales' Royal Indian Military College, Dehradun.

Military career
Sharma went on to join the fifth Regular Course at the Indian Military Academy, Dehradun and he was commissioned on 4 June 1950 into the 16th Light Cavalry. He fought in the 1965 War against Pakistan in the Lahore Sector. He commanded the 66th Armoured Regiment and later a Mountain Brigade in an insurgency affected area. Awarded the Ati Vishisht Seva Medal for distinguished service, General Sharma took over as GOC-in-C of the Eastern Command, on 1 June 1987 and was appointed Honorary Army ADC to the President on 25 July 1987. He took over as the Chief of Army Staff on 1 May 1988. He retired on 30 June 1990.

Honours and awards

Dates of rank

References

1930 births
Living people
Chiefs of Army Staff (India)
Indian generals
Rashtriya Indian Military College alumni
Recipients of the Param Vishisht Seva Medal
National Defence College, India alumni
Recipients of the Ati Vishisht Seva Medal